The Twenty-sixth Legislature of Albania (Albanian: Legjislatura e njëzet e gjashtë), officially known as the V Pluralist Legislature of Albania (Albanian: Legjislatura e V Pluraliste e Shqipërisë), was the legislature of Albania following the 2001 Albanian Parliamentary election of Members of Parliament (MPs) to the Albanian Parliament. The party of the Prime Minister Ilir Meta, PS, obtained majority of 83 deputies.

26th Legislature 

The two largest political parties in Albania are the Socialist Party (PS) and the Democratic Party (PD).Following is a list of political parties and alliances with representation in the Parliament by the 3 September 2001 elections:

MPS 

Agron Duka PS
Agron Tato PS
Albert Çaçi PS
Aleksandër Garuli PD
Anastas Angjeli PS
Arben Imami AD
Arben Malaj PS
Ardian Myslimaj PS
Arjan Starova BLD
Arta Dade PS
Asllan Haxhiu PS
Astrit Bushati PD
Ardit Kaja PS
Athem Fezollari PD
Azgan Haklaj PD
Bamir Topi PD
Banush Gozhdari PS 
Bardhyl Agasi PS
Bardhyl Londo PD
Bashkim Fino PS
Bahri Kollçaku PD
Ben Blushi PS
Besnik Mustafaj PD
Brahim Bruka PD
Blendi Klosi PS
Dashamir Shehi PDR
Dilaver Qesja PD
Dritan Prifti PS
Durim Hushi PS
Edi Paloka PD
Eduart Alushi PS
Ejup Tabaku PS
Elida Tepelena PS
Elmaz Sherifi PS
Engjëll Bejtaj PSD
Eqerem Spahiu PD
Erjon Braçe PS
Et’hem Ruka PS
Ermelinda Meksi PS
Fatbardha Shabani PS
Fatmir Xhindi PS
Fatmir Mediu PR
Fatmir Xhafaj PS 
Fatos Beja PD
Fatos Nano PS
Ferid Hoti PD
Flamur Dingo PS
Flamur Hoxha PS
Gani Hoxha PD
Gaqo Apostoli PSD
Gazmir Bizhga PS
Genc Pollo PDR
Gjergj Koja PS
Gjovalin Bzheta PD
Gramoz Ruçi PS
Hasan Hoxha PS
Ilir Bano PD
Ilir Gjoni PS
Ilir Meta PS
Ilir Zela PS
Ilirian Barzani PDR|
Jak Ndokaj PDR
Jemin Gjana PD
Jozefina Topalli PD
Kastriot Islami PS
Lekë Çukaj PS
Ligoraq Karamelo PBDNJ
Luan Memushi PS
Luan Rama PS
Luan Skuqi PD
Lufter Xhuveli PAA
Luigj Gjoka PD
Makbule Çeço PS
Maksim Begeja PD
Maksut Balla PS
Maqo Lakrori PS
Marieta Pronjari PD
Marko Bello PS
Mezan Malaj PS
Monika Kryemadhi PS
Muhamet Ukperaj PD
Musa Ulqini PS
Mustafa Muçi| PS
Mustafa Xhani PS
Namik Dokle PS
Nard Ndoka PDR
Nazmir Bilani PS
Ndre Legisi PS
Ndriçim Babasi PD
Ndriçim Hysa PS
Ndue Preka PAA
Neritan Alibali PD
Neritan Ceka AD
Nezir Selimaj PS
Niko Faber PS
Nikollë Lesi IND
Pal Dajçi PD
Pandeli Majko PS
Paskal Milo PSD
Pëllumb Berisha PD
Petro Koçi PS
Pjetër Arbnori PD
Preç Zogaj AD
Qazim Tepshi PDR
Rahmi Mehmetllari PS
Refet Dervina  PAA
Ridvan Bode PD
Robert Çeku PD
Sabit Brokaj PS
Sadedin Balla PD
Saimir Curri PDR
Sali Berisha PD
Sali Shehu PD
Servet Pëllumbi PS
Shaban Memia PD
Shpëtim Kateshi PS
Shpëtim Roqi|PD
Shyqyri Duraku PS
Skënder Gjinushi PSD
Sokol Olldashi PD
Sotir Kokeri PS
Spartak Braho PS 
Spartak Poçi PS
Stefan Çipa PS
Taulant Dedja PS
Teodor Laço PD
Limoz Dizdari PS
Uran Metko PD
Valentina Leskaj PS
Valentin Palaj PD
Vangjel Dule PBDNJ
Vangjel Tavo PS
Kristo Goci PBDNJ
Vath Koreshi PS
Viktor Doda PS
Vili Minarolli PD
Vladimir Malo PS
Ylli Bufi PS
Zef Gjoka PD
Zyhdi Pepa PS

References 

Legislatures of Albania